The 2020–21 NBL season was the 38th season for Melbourne United in the NBL, and the 7th under the banner of Melbourne United.

Roster

Transactions

Signings

 Mitch McCarron, Shea Ili, Casey Prather, Jo Lual-Acuil and Sam Short all remained with the club after they previously signed multiple season contracts. Head Coach Dean Vickerman and assistant coach Ross McMains also remained with the club under their multiple season contracts.
 On 15 July 2020, United signed their first new contract for the season. Jack White of Duke University signed a three-season deal with the club.
 On 17 July 2020, guard Chris Goulding re-signed with the club on a three-season deal, which will take his total seasons with the club to eight.
 On 19 July 2020, United signed Yudai Baba on a one-season Special Restricted Player deal.
 On 22 July 2020, David Barlow also re-signed with the club on a new one-season deal.
 On 24 July 2020, Mason Peatling was signed to a three-season deal, with him being assigned as a development player for the first season.
 On 14 August 2020, Sam McDaniel was re-signed for his third season with the club on a one-season deal.
 On 20 August 2020, United released Casey Prather from the final season of his contract.
 On 21 August 2020, United also released assistant coach Ross McMains from his contract.
 On 30 November 2020, Scotty Hopson signed a one year deal with the club, filling United’s first Import slot.
 On 10 December 2020, Jock Landale signed one-year deal with the club.
 On 9 February 2021, following multiple injuries Dillon Stith was added to the squad as an injury replacement player.
 On 13 March 2021, C. J. Asuncion-Byrd was signed as the injury replacement player for Baba.
 On 8 April, David Andersen signed as the injury replacement player for White.

Game log

Pre-season 

|-style="background:#cfc;"
| 1
| 31 December
| @ Cairns
| W 81–97
| Chris Goulding (17)
| Jock Landale (8)
| Mitch McCarron (5) 
| Cairns Pop-Up Arenanot announced 
| 1–0

Regular season 

|-style="background:#cfc;"
| 1
| 15 January
| @ Adelaide
| W 65–89
| Goulding, Lual-Acuil (16)
| Jo Lual-Acuil (12)
| Scotty Hopson (4)
| Adelaide Entertainment Centre6,539
| 1–0
|-style="background:#cfc;"
| 2
| 25 January
| @ Cairns
| W 85–87
| Jock Landale (19)
| Jo Lual-Acuil (11)
| Ili, McCarron (4)
| Cairns Pop-Up Arena1,896
| 2–0
|-style="background:#cfc;"
| 3
| 31 January
| South East Melbourne
| W 96–90
| Jack White (22)
| Jock Landale (7)
| Mitch McCarron (6)
| Bendigo Stadium2,000
| 3–0

|-style="background:#cfc;"
| 4
| 5 February
| @ Brisbane
| W 96–109
| Chris Goulding (27)
| Jock Landale (13)
| Mitch McCarron (8)
| Nissan Arena2,234
| 4–0
|-style="background:#cfc;"
| 5
| 7 February
| Perth
| W 75–71
| Jock Landale (16)
| Jack White (8)
| Scotty Hopson (6)
| Bendigo Stadium1,953
| 5–0
|-style="background:#cfc;"
| 6
| 10 February
| @ Illawarra
| W 88–91
| Scotty Hopson (21)
| Scotty Hopson (9)
| Mitch McCarron (7)
| WIN Entertainment Centre3,459
| 6–0

|-style="background:#fcc;"
| 7
| 20 February
| Perth
| L 85–89
| Jock Landale (20)
| Jock Landale (10)
| Hopson, Landale (4)
| John Cain Arena3,711
| 6–1
|-style="background:#cfc;"
| 8
| 22 February
| Cairns
| W 88–81
| Jock Landale (18)
| Jock Landale (11)
| Mitch McCarron (7)
| John Cain Arena2,313
| 7–1
|-style="background:#cfc;"
| 9
| 25 February
| @ Adelaide
| W 73–82
| Mitch McCarron (18)
| McCarron (10)
| Scotty Hopson (4)
| John Cain Arena1,991
| 8–1
|-style="background:#cfc;"
| 10
| 27 February
| Sydney
| W 83–80
| Jock Landale (20)
| Jo Lual-Acuil (10)
| Mitch McCarron (6)
| John Cain Arena4,206
| 9–1
|-style="background:#cfc;"
| 11
| 5 March
| @ New Zealand
| W 84–87
| Jock Landale (23)
| Mitch McCarron (7)
| Mitch McCarron (7)
| John Cain Arena3,421
| 10–1
|-style="background:#fcc;"
| 12
| 7 March
| Brisbane
| L 88–96
| Chris Goulding (21)
| Jock Landale (11)
| Baba, Ili (3)
| John Cain Arena3,696
| 10–2
|-style="background:#fcc;"
| 13
| 10 March
| @ South East Melbourne
| L 97–92 (OT)
| Goulding, Landale (22)
| Jo Lual-Acuil (9)
| Shea Ili (6)
| John Cain Arena3,675
| 10–3
|-style="background:#fcc;"
| 14
| 13 March
| @ Illawarra
| L 77–69
| Mitch McCarron (16)
| Jock Landale (8)
| Landale, McCarron (4)
| John Cain Arena4,183
| 10–4

|-style="background:#fcc;"
| 15
| 19 March
| @ Sydney
| L 103–75
| Jock Landale (18)
| Ili, Landale (7)
| Chris Goulding (6)
| Qudos Bank Arena5,089
| 10–5
|-style="background:#cfc;"
| 16
| 21 March
| Illawarra
| W 75–65
| Jock Landale (19)
| Mitch McCarron (11)
| Goulding, McCarron (5)
| John Cain Arena2,552
| 11–5
|-style="background:#cfc;"
| 17
| 25 March
| @ New Zealand
| W 79–82
| Ili, McCarron (16)
| Mitch McCarron (7)
| Mitch McCarron (7)
| Bendigo Stadium1,150
| 12–5
|-style="background:#cfc;"
| 18
| 27 March
| @ South East Melbourne
| W 60–80
| Chris Goulding (25)
| Mason Peatling (12)
| Mitch McCarron (6)
| John Cain Arena3,370
| 13–5

|-style="background:#cfc;"
| 19
| 2 April
| Cairns
| W 95–85
| Jock Landale (20)
| Jock Landale (11)
| Hopson, McCarron (4)
| John Cain Arena3,673
| 14–5
|-style="background:#cfc;"
| 20
| 4 April
| @ Cairns
| W 73–83
| Chris Goulding (15)
| Landale, Lual-Acuil (10)
| Mitch McCarron (7)
| Cairns Pop-Up Arena1,847
| 15–5
|-style="background:#cfc;"
| 21
| 10 April
| New Zealand
| W 84–78
| Scotty Hopson (19)
| Jock Landale (11)
| Mitch McCarron (5)
| John Cain Arena2,717
| 16–5
|-style="background:#cfc;"
| 22
| 12 April
| Brisbane
| W 98–89
| Jock Landale (23)
| Jock Landale (13)
| Mitch McCarron (12)
| John Cain Arena3,422
| 17–5
|-style="background:#cfc;"
| 23
| 18 April
| Illawarra
| W 87–76
| Jo Lual-Acuil (15)
| Jock Landale (11)
| Jock Landale (5)
| John Cain Arena3,794
| 18–5
|-style="background:#cfc;"
| 24
| 24 April
| Adelaide
| W 92–78
| Mitch McCarron (21)
| Landale, Lual-Acuil (10)
| Mitch McCarron (5)
| John Cain Arena3,034
| 19–5
|-style="background:#cfc;"
| 25
| 28 April
| New Zealand
| W 90–76
| Scotty Hopson (25)
| Jo Lual-Acuil (9)
| Barlow, Goulding, McCarron (3)
| John Cain Arena2,173
| 20–5

|-style="background:#cfc;"
| 26
| 2 May
| Sydney
| W 103–78
| Chris Goulding (21)
| Jo Lual-Acuil (9)
| Mitch McCarron (8)
| John Cain Arena2,214
| 21–5
|-style="background:#fcc;"
| 27
| 5 May
| Perth
| L 69–82
| Jock Landale (11)
| Jo Lual-Acuil (10)
| Mitch McCarron (5)
| John Cain Arena2,011
| 21–6
|-style="background:#cfc;"
| 28
| 8 May
| @ South East Melbourne
| W 82–93
| Jock Landale (27)
| Jock Landale (11)
| Yudai Baba (3)
| John Cain Arena3,899
| 22–6
|-style="background:#cfc;"
| 29
| 13 May
| @ Perth
| W 91–99
| Chris Goulding (26)
| Jock Landale (7)
| Mitch McCarron (6)
| RAC Arena9,987
| 23–6
|-style="background:#fcc;"
| 30
| 16 May
| South East Melbourne
| L 83–94
| Jock Landale (19)
| Mitch McCarron (7)
| Mitch McCarron 6
| John Cain Arena3,460
| 23–7
|-style="background:#cfc;"
| 31
| 18 May
| @ Illawarra
| W 87–102
| Chris Goulding (25)
| Jock Landale (10)
| Scotty Hopson (8)
| WIN Entertainment Centre1,794
| 24–7
|-style="background:#cfc;"
| 32
| 24 May
| @ Brisbane
| W 88–99
| Chris Goulding (22)
| McCarron, Peatling (6)
| Mitch McCarron (7)
| Nissan Arena1,614
| 25–7
|-style="background:#fcc;"
| 33
| 29 May
| @ Sydney
| L 100–98 (2OT)
| Jock Landale (23)
| Jock Landale (12)
| Mitch McCarron (9)
| Qudos Bank Arena6,238
| 25–8
|-style="background:#cfc;"
| 34
| 31 May
| Cairns
| W 101–76
| Jock Landale (19)
| Mason Peatling (11)
| Scotty Hopson (5)
| Qudos Bank Arenaclosed event
| 26–8

|-style="background:#cfc;"
| 35
| 4 June
| @ Perth
| W 64–78
| Jo Lual-Acuil (16)
| Mitch McCarron (6)
| Mitch McCarron (5)
| RAC Arena12,185
| 27–8
|-style="background:#cfc;"
| 36
| 6 June
| Adelaide
| W 102–80
| Hopson, Landale (19)
| Jock Landale (9)
| Shea Ili (8)
| Adelaide Entertainment Centre1,817
| 28–8

Postseason 

|-style="background:#cfc;"
| 1
| 11 June
| South East Melbourne
| W 96–78
| Jock Landale (26)
| Mason Peatling (6)
| Mitch McCarron (5)
| Qudos Bank Arena500
| 1–0
|-style="background:#fcc;"
| 2
| 13 June
| @ South East Melbourne
| L 90–79
| Scotty Hopson (19)
| Lual-Acuil, Peatling (7)
| McCarron, Lual-Acuil, Peatling (4)
| Qudos Bank Arena500
| 1–1
|-style="background:#cfc;"
| 3
| 15 June
| South East Melbourne
| W 84–74
| Jock Landale (27)
| Landale, McCarron (8)
| Mitch McCarron (6)
| Qudos Bank Arena500
| 2–1

|-style="background:#cfc;"
| 1
| 18 June
| @ Perth
| W 70–73
| Chris Goulding (23)
| Mitch McCarron (11)
| Mitch McCarron (6)
| RAC Arena9,951
| 1–0
|-style="background:#cfc;"
| 2
| 20 June
| @ Perth
| W 74–83
| Chris Goulding (21)
| Jock Landale (17)
| Mitch McCarron (7)
| RAC Arena11,097
| 2–0
|-style="background:#cfc;"
| 3
| 25 June
| Perth
| W 81–76
| Jock Landale (15)
| Jock Landale (9)
| Mitch McCarron (5)
| John Cain Arena4,507
| 3–0

Ladder

Awards

Player of the Week 
 Round 7, Mitch McCarron

NBL Awards 
 All-NBL First Team: Jock Landale

 All-NBL Second Team: Chris Goulding & Mitch McCarron

 Best Sixth Man: Jo Lual-Acuil

 Executive of the Year: Mark Boyd

Melbourne United Awards 
 Most Valuable Player: Jock Landale 

 Best Defensive Player: Yudai Baba

 Coaches Award: Yudai Baba

 Best Club Person Award: Fiona Gant

Finals Series 
 Grand Final MVP: Jock Landale

See also 
 2020–21 NBL season
 Melbourne United

References

External links 

 Official Website

Melbourne United
Melbourne United seasons
Melbourne United season